The Ritual Killer is an American action-thriller film directed by George Gallo. It stars Cole Hauser and Morgan Freeman. It was released by Screen Media on March 10, 2023.

Premise
Unable to process the death of his daughter, Detective Boyd embarks on a hunt for a serial killer who murders according to a brutal tribal ritual known as Muti. The only person who can help Boyd is Professor Mackles, an anthropologist hiding an unspeakable secret.

Cast
 Cole Hauser as Detective Boyd
 Morgan Freeman as Professor Mackles
 Peter Stormare
 Vernon Davis
 Brian Kurlander
 Mayumi Roller as Deelie Boyd
 Murielle Hilaire
 Julie Lott

Production
In August 2021, it was reported that George Gallo would direct the action thriller film Muti. The screenplay was written by Bob Bowersox, Jennifer Lemmon, Francesco Cinquemani, Giorgia Iannone, Luca Giliberto, and Ferdinando Dell'Omo, based on a story by Joe Lemmon, Cinquemani and Iannone. Cole Hauser, Morgan Freeman, Peter Stormare, and Vernon Davis were announced as part of the cast. Filming began that same month in Jackson, Mississippi, with Murielle Hilaire and Julie Lott joining the cast. Additional filming took place in Rome, Italy. In September 2021, Redbox Entertainment acquired distribution rights to the film in the United States and Canada.

Release
In February 2023, the film's trailer was released, revealing its new title, The Ritual Killer. It was released by Screen Media in theaters, on demand and as a DVD and Blu-Ray Redbox Exclusive on March 10, 2023.

References

External links
 

2023 action thriller films
2020s American films
2020s English-language films
2020s serial killer films
American action thriller films
American serial killer films
Films directed by George Gallo
Films shot in Mississippi
Films shot in Rome
Upcoming English-language films